Arthur Stanley Theodore Fisher (1906–1989) was a mid-20th-century Church of England priest and writer. He wrote a number of poems, religious works and local histories as A. S. T. Fisher and one novel under the pseudonym Michael Scarrott.

Family
Fisher was the son of Reverend Arthur Bryan Fisher (1870–1955), a Church of England priest who was a Church Missionary Society missionary in the Uganda Protectorate. Fisher was married and had a daughter.

Education
Fisher studied at Christ Church, Oxford, where he lived on the same stair as W. H. Auden. The two students had frequent late-night arguments about religion, and in 1925, Fisher reintroduced Auden to Christopher Isherwood. In 1926, Auden's mother, Constance, was concerned about her son, so Fisher wrote to her "the fact that he is naturally more self-sufficient than most people explains why he finds so little need for a personal God – or for a Mother".

In 1928, the journal Oxford Poetry published three of Fisher's poems.

Career
By early 1934, Fisher was chaplain of the recently founded Bryanston School, a public school in Dorset, but had left by February 1935. By 1952, he was chaplain of Magdalen College School, Oxford, and by 1970, he was Vicar of Westwell, Oxfordshire.

Fisher wrote books of prayers and other Christian matters, poems, and later three histories of parishes in West Oxfordshire. Longman published his An Anthology of Prayers Compiled for use in School and Home in 1934 and republished it a number of times from 1943 to 1959. Under the pseudonym of Michael Scarrott, Fisher wrote a gay novel set in a fictitious Dorset public school, which Reginald Caton's Fortune Press published in 1955. The novel was illustrated by Fisher's son-in-law, B.H. (Barry) Surie.

Works

As A. S. T. Fisher

As Michael Scarrott

References

Alumni of Christ Church, Oxford
Anglican writers
20th-century English Anglican priests
Historians of Oxfordshire
1906 births
1989 deaths
20th-century English poets
20th-century English historians